Catch 22 is the second full-length solo studio album by recording artist Tinchy Stryder. After three successful singles leading up to the album. The album was then released on 17 August 2009. The album is produced and co-written by award-winning producer and songwriter Fraser T Smith, whose previous credits include James Morrison, Craig David and Kano.

The album was preceded by a collaborative album with grime producer Maniac and a two-part free downloadable extended plays (EP), Star in the Hood EP Vol. 1 & Star in the Hood EP Vol. 2. Tinchy Stryder toured his album, Catch 22, in October 2009, and again in February/March 2010.

Critical reception 

The Mirror gave the album a positive review: "...keen learner with an eye on the crossover market, Stryder shows infectious energy and determination to cover his core market on this second album. Check the auto-tuned pop thrills of Take Me Back and Shake Me. Stryder cuts an impressive sway as the hardworking pupil of the Grime Crossover Contingent." The Telegraph gave the album 3/5 stars and said: "American rappers have their guns. Tinchy Stryder has his mum. The witty domesticity of Stryder’s raps are part of the charm of this decidedly British hip hop album. Coming from the grime world, but not in the least grimy, the hook laden, techno-pop tracks are so relentlessly catchy, his unpretentious, snotty-nosed lyricism is like aural icing on a sugary pop cake."The Times gave the album 3/5 stars and said: "With a second No 1 single under his belt, Kwasi Danquah III, 22, is being hailed by wishful thinkers as the second coming of grime. Catch 22 is an uneasy balancing act between these two Stryder sides; but it makes for compelling spectacle."The Independent however was much less favourable of the album giving it 2/5 stars: "Tinchy Stryder may be the second-biggest name in grime, but Catch 22 suggests he's more in the mould of Akon than Dizzee Rascal: there's little of Dizzee's bonkers charm about these tracks, and plenty of Akon's reliance on auto-tuned hooks and romantic themes. Indeed, when not reflecting on his success, Tinchy's time seems mostly taken up with oiling his way into girls' affections, trying to extricate himself from their clinging attentions, or apologising for mistreating them."

Commercial performance 
At the beginning of the week commencing Monday 17 August 2009 Catch 22 was duelling with Calvin Harris's Ready for the Weekend for the top spot in the UK, with only 1,000 copies between them. By the last mid-week update there was only a few copies between them. Catch 22 reached No. 2 in the UK by the end of the week, with Harris outselling Stryder by 8000 copies. Tinchy Stryder used his official Twitter to convey his gratitude to his fans for the high charting of the album. In its second week the album fell to No. 5 in the UK and was certified Gold in the UK.

In Ireland, the album debuted and peaked at No. 9.

Singles 
 The first single "Stryderman", was released as a digital download on 20 July 2008 with the CD single released on 8 August 2008. The song was added to BBC Radio 1's C Playlist in July 2008 and debuted on the UK Singles Chart at number 73; Stryder's first single to chart in the UK.
 The second single "Take Me Back", which also featured fellow Universal Island Records-signed act Taio Cruz was released on 19 January 2009. The single received high amount of praise and received placement on Radio 1's A Playlist. The single eventually peaked at number 3 in the UK; marking Stryder's first Top 10 single in the UK.
 The third single "Number 1" which featured UK trio N-Dubz became Stryder's second Top 10 single and first number-one single in the UK when it debuted at the top spot on the UK Singles Chart on 27 April 2009.
 The fourth single "Never Leave You" featured vocals from Amelle Berrabah of the Sugababes and was released on 9 August 2009; where it peaked at number-one in the UK, Stryder's third consecutive Top 10 single on the UK Singles Chart.
 The fifth and final single "You're Not Alone" was released on 26 October 2009, where it reached number 14 in the UK; marking the fourth UK Top 15 hit from Stryder.

Track listing 

Notes
 "Spotlight" samples elements of "Dooms Night" by Azzido Da Bass.
 "You're Not Alone" contains an interpolation of "You're Not Alone" by Olive.
 "Express Urself" contains an interpolation of "Express Yourself" by Charles Wright & the Watts 103rd Street Rhythm Band.

Charts

Weekly charts

Year-end charts

Certifications

Release history

References

External links 
 Star in the Hood EP, Volume 1 (free download)
 Star in the Hood EP, Volume 2 (free download)

2009 albums
Tinchy Stryder albums
Albums produced by Tinchy Stryder
Albums produced by Fraser T. Smith
Takeover Entertainment albums
Albums produced by Labrinth
Albums produced by Chase & Status
Albums produced by TMS (production team)